David Hooper (born 31 March 1991) is a cricketer who plays for Guernsey. He played in the 2014 ICC World Cricket League Division Five tournament. In May 2015 he participated in the 2015 ICC Europe Division One tournament.

He played in the 2016 ICC World Cricket League Division Five tournament. In September 2017, he took the most wickets for Guernsey in the 2017 ICC World Cricket League Division Five tournament, with a total of fourteen dismissals in five matches.

In May 2019, he was named in Guernsey's squad for the 2019 T20 Inter-Insular Cup. He made his Twenty20 International (T20I) debut for Guernsey against Jersey on 31 May 2019. The same month, he was named in Guernsey's squad for the Regional Finals of the 2018–19 ICC T20 World Cup Europe Qualifier tournament in Guernsey.

References

External links
 

1991 births
Living people
Guernsey cricketers
Guernsey Twenty20 International cricketers
Place of birth missing (living people)